Veerapat Nilburapha (born 22 June 1996), is a Thai professional footballer who plays as a forward for Thai League 1 club Police Tero.

References

External links
https://us.soccerway.com/players/verapat-nilburapha/522014/
http://www.truebangkokunitedfc.com/teams/team-b.html

1996 births
Living people
Veerapat Nilburapha
Veerapat Nilburapha
Association football forwards
Veerapat Nilburapha
Veerapat Nilburapha
Veerapat Nilburapha
Veerapat Nilburapha